Cordylancistrus is a genus of suckermouth armored catfish native to South America. It is much the same as Chaetostoma. The few differences are a wider head, longer cheek odontodes, and plates on the snout. Cordylancistrus can be found in rivers and streams high in the Andes, from Venezuela to Colombia.

Species 
There are currently 4 recognized species in this genus:
 Cordylancistrus daguae (C. H. Eigenmann, 1912)
 Cordylancistrus nephelion Provenzano & Milani, 2006
 Cordylancistrus perijae A. Pérez & Provenzano, 1996
 Cordylancistrus torbesensis (L. P. Schultz, 1944)

References

Loricariidae
Fish of South America
Catfish genera
Taxa named by Isaäc J. H. Isbrücker
Freshwater fish genera